Meir Ariel (March 2, 1942 – July 18, 1999) was an Israeli singer-songwriter and guitarist.

He was known as a "man of words" for his poetic use of the Hebrew language in his lyrics. His influences included Hebrew poets such as ibn Gabirol, Natan Alterman, S. Y. Agnon and Hayim Nahman Bialik, and American singer-songwriters such as Bob Dylan. Ariel's fame and recognition grew posthumously.

Biography

Ariel was born on the Fast of Esther in 1942 and grew up in Kibbutz Mishmarot. Since childhood he was a friend of Shalom Hanoch, who also lived there and who went on to become one of Israel's most popular rock artists.

Ariel served in the Paratroopers Brigade of the IDF and participated as part of that brigade in the Battle for Jerusalem at the beginning of the Six-Day War. This inspired him to write the song "Yerushalayim Shel Barzel" ("Jerusalem of Iron"). The song was based on Naomi Shemer's hit song "Jerusalem of Gold", and borrowed its melody (in turn borrowed from the Basque folk song "Pello Joxepe"). It was his reaction to what he saw as the hyper-patriotism of the Israeli public and media of that time. The "Yerushalayim Shel Barzel" mini-album cover showed Ariel in his military uniform thus giving him the nickname "the singing paratrooper".

After living in the United States for some time, Ariel returned to Israel and decided to create folk rock-inspired music. He fought in the Yom Kippur War in the Suez Canal and returned to Mishmarót after the war. Between 1978 and 1988, he released his first three LPs. The first album's title, Shirey Chag Umoed Venofel, is a play on words of the term "Shirèy Chag uMoèd" which means "holiday songs". The album's title could also mean, in Hebrew, "songs for circling, tripping, and falling".

In 1987, Ariel, his wife Tirtza, and their three children moved to Tel Aviv. Between 1990 and 1997, he released one more LP, one collection album, one live album and three more LPs, the last one being Bernard veLouise [Bernard and Louise].

In 1998, Ariel made a series of condemning comments about the gay and lesbian community in several interviews. This resulted in a majority of his LGBT followers boycotting him and several protests took place outside his home and his performances. In one incident, a few protesters spat on Ariel and poured water on him. As a result, he took a break from performing and apologised for his comments two months later, saying they were prejudiced and ignorant.

Ariel died on July 18, 1999 from the Mediterranean spotted (or "Boutonneuse") fever which is caused by the rickettsia parasite and transmitted by a tick bite. He was buried in Mishmarot's cemetery.

Several tribute albums performed by various Israeli artists performing his songs were released posthumously, among them several live memorial performances, and a track-by-track re-recording of his 1995 album Rishumey Pecham [charcoal sketches]. An album of Ariel's own unreleased recordings was released as well, titled "Mode Ani", which can be translated as "I am thankful" (based on the Jewish morning prayer).  Ehud Banai wrote "B'loez Canaani", "Caananite Blues" in his memory.

Among the many artists for whom Meir Ariel wrote are Shalom Hanoch, Arik Einstein, Rita, Sharon Haziz and David Broza.

In 2009, the Israeli postal service issued a stamp in his honor. Ariel is one of the central characters in Yossi Klein Halevi's 2013 Like Dreamers: The Story of the Israeli Paratroopers Who Reunited Jerusalem and Divided a Nation (and Halevi's book is the closest to an English-language biography of Ariel to appear). A biography in Hebrew by Prof. Nisim Calderon and Prof. Oded Zehavi was published in late 2016, entitled "One Errol: A biography of Meir Ariel."

Discography

Albums
Shirey Chag Umoed Venofel (Songs of holiday and falling commemorative day) 1978
...Ugluy Eynayim (...And With Eyes Revealed) 1984
Yerukot (Green) 1988
Zir'ey Kayitz (Seeds of Summer) 1993
Rishumey Pecham (Coal Sketches) 1995
Bernard Velouise (Bernard and Louise) 1997
Mode Ani (I Thank/I confess) 2000

EPs
Yerushalayim Shel Barzel (Jerusalem of Iron) 1967
Avarnu Et Par'o (We overcame Pharaoh) 1990

Best of albums
Mivchar (Selection) 1991
Haosef (The Collection) 2001
Hameytav (The Best of Meir Ariel) 2004

Live albums
Dlatot Niftachot Me'atzman (with the band, 'Charisma') (Doors Are Opened By Themselves) 1998
Behofa'a Acharona Bemoadon Barby 1999 (On a Last Concert At The Barby Club 1999) 2002

Tribute live albums
Im Hagav Layam (With My Back To The Sea) 2000
Erev Kachol Amok (Deep Blue Evening) 2002
Chamesh Shanim (Five Years) 2005

Videography 
Masa Habchirot Shel Meir Ariel (Meir Ariel's Campaign Tour) 1988
Derech Dim'a Shkufa – Hahofa'a (Through a Clear Tear – The Show) 2003

References

External links
  
Jerusalem of Iron, Lyrics and analysis

1942 births
1999 deaths
Jewish Israeli musicians
Israeli male singer-songwriters
Israeli folk singers
Israeli rock singers
Israeli blues singers
Israeli rock guitarists
20th-century Israeli male singers
Jewish folk singers
Infectious disease deaths in Israel